Paddhari is a census town in Rajkot district in the Indian state of Gujarat. Paddhari has headquarters of Paddhari Taluka.

Geography

Demographics
 India census, Paddhari had a population of 9225. Males constitute 51% of the population and females 49%. Paddhari has an average literacy rate of 65%, higher than the national average of 59.5%: male literacy is 70%, and female literacy is 59%. In Paddhari, 13% of the population is under 6 years of age.

References

Cities and towns in Rajkot district